The 1979 World Series was the championship series of Major League Baseball's (MLB) 1979 season. The 76th edition of the World Series was a best-of-seven playoff played between the National League (NL) champion Pittsburgh Pirates (98–64) and the American League (AL) champion Baltimore Orioles (102–57). The Pirates won in seven games, becoming the fourth team in World Series history to come back from a three-games-to-one deficit to win the Series. This marked the second time in the 1970s the Pirates won a World Series Game 7 on the road against the Orioles, the previous time being in the 1971 World Series. The Pirates were famous for adopting Sister Sledge's hit song "We Are Family" as their theme song during the 1979 season.

Willie Stargell, Rennie Stennett, Frank Taveras, pitchers Bruce Kison and Doc Ellis, and catcher Manny Sanguillén were the only players left over from the Pirates team that defeated the Orioles in 1971, and Orioles' pitcher Jim Palmer, shortstop Mark Belanger, and manager Earl Weaver were the only remaining Orioles from the 1971 team. Grant Jackson pitched for the Orioles in the 1971 series and for the Pirates in the 1979 series.

In this series, it was the AL team's "turn" to play by NL rules, meaning there was no designated hitter and the Orioles' pitchers would have to bat. While this resulted in Tim Stoddard getting his first major league hit and runs batted in in Game 4, overall, it hurt the Orioles because Lee May, their designated hitter for much of the season and a key part of their offense, was only able to bat three times in the whole series.

Willie Stargell, who was named the World Series Most Valuable Player, hit .400 with a record seven extra-base hits and matched Reggie Jackson's record of 25 total bases, set in 1977.

The 1979 Pirates were the last team to win Game 7 of a World Series on the road until the San Francisco Giants defeated the Royals in Kansas City to win Game 7 of the  series.  With the Steelers having already won Super Bowl XIII (they would later repeat in Super Bowl XIV following the Pirates' championship), Pittsburgh also became the third city to win both the Super Bowl and the World Series in the same season or calendar year. New York's Jets and Mets won championships in the 1969 calendar year, followed by Baltimore (Orioles and Colts) in the 1970 season, New York (Mets and Giants) in the 1986 season, and Boston/New England in the 2004 (Red Sox and Patriots) and 2018 seasons (Red Sox and Patriots).

Background

Baltimore Orioles

Earl Weaver's Orioles had won the first two games of that series only to lose to Danny Murtaugh's Pirates in seven. This time Pittsburgh manager Chuck Tanner was looking to win a Series of his own. Gone were the likes of slugger Boog Powell and defensive wizard Brooks Robinson—shortstop Mark Belanger and pitcher Jim Palmer were the only two remaining players from the 1971 roster. A young (23-year-old) "Steady Eddie" Murray was a staple at first-base and an emerging superstar. The only other real "star" hitter on the team was right-fielder Ken Singleton who set career highs in home runs, 35, and runs batted in, 111, in the regular season. Center fielder Al Bumbry provided the speed, 37 swipes, and outfielder Gary Roenicke and third-baseman Doug DeCinces provided some additional power. The talented pitching staff was captained by veteran catcher Rick Dempsey. The starters were led by 1979 Cy Young Award winner Mike Flanagan (23–9, 3.08), Scott McGregor (13–6, 3.35), Steve Stone (11–7, 3.77) and Jim Palmer (10–6, 3.30). The bullpen helped with 30 wins against only 13 losses led by Don Stanhouse (7–3, 21 saves) and Tippy Martinez (10–3, 2.88). The Orioles won the American League East rather easily, finishing eight games ahead of the second place Milwaukee Brewers. Many considered the series a bit of a whitewash.

Pittsburgh Pirates

On the other hand, these Pittsburgh Pirates struggled early in the season, eventually winning the National League East by just two games over the Montreal Expos.  Only after getting infielders, Tim Foli (from the New York Mets) and Bill Madlock (from the San Francisco Giants), did the Pirates start winning consistently.  The great Roberto Clemente had inspired the 1971 team toward the title, and the key ingredient to the 1979 team was his successor and spiritual leader, 38-year-old Willie "Pops" Stargell.  His clubhouse demeanor, a simple good-heartedness and friendly manner, helped keep the Pirates loose during a tight divisional race with a surprise sweep of the always powerful Cincinnati Reds in the League Championship Series.

The Bucs lineup featured the National League leader in stolen bases, Omar Moreno with 77; team runs batted in leader, Dave Parker with 94, and two-time batting champion, Bill Madlock (1975, 1976).  Madlock would add two more batting titles in 1981 and 1983. The pitching staff was a ragtag bunch led by the "Candy-Man" John Candelaria's 14 wins (nine losses), with five other pitchers winning ten or more games.  The tall and lean Kent Tekulve had 31 saves, good for second in the league, while winning ten games.

"Pops" Stargell would hit three home runs in this series becoming the oldest player to win both the regular season MVP and the World Series MVP.  His "Family" would persevere after losing three out of the first four games, giving Earl Weaver and his Orioles a déjà vu nightmare when the Bucs came back to win in seven games.

Summary

Matchups

Game 1

Game 1 was originally scheduled for Tuesday, October 9 but was postponed due to a wintry mix of rain and snow. When it was played the following night, the first-pitch temperature of 41 °F (5 °C) was the coldest in the history of the Fall Classic until it was eclipsed 18 years later in Game 4 of the 1997 World Series. A steady rain that fell throughout the contest also factored into the six total errors, three committed by each team. All five Orioles runs were scored in the first inning; two on a throwing error by second baseman Phil Garner, followed by one on a wild pitch by starter Bruce Kison and the final two on a Doug DeCinces home run. A pair of RBIs each for Garner (two-out single in the sixth) and Willie Stargell (groundout in the fourth, leadoff homer in the eighth) sparked a Pirates comeback that fell a run short.

Game 2

This time, the Pirates struck first with two in the second on an RBI single by Bill Madlock and a sacrifice fly by catcher Ed Ott.  The Orioles countered in the bottom half of the inning with an Eddie Murray homer.  Murray would also tie the game in the sixth by doubling in Ken Singleton.  Murray tried to put the Orioles ahead in the same inning by tagging and attempting to score on a line-out to right by John Lowenstein, but Dave Parker threw him out easily.  Making the decision to send Murray was made that much more odd by the fact that Parker's throw to the plate arrived well ahead of him.  Murray tried to bowl Ott over at the plate, but the stocky Ott held fast, staying on his feet.

Murray also made a questionable base running decision in the eighth.  With Murray on second and Doug DeCinces on first with no outs, Lowenstein grounded to shortstop Tim Foli.  Murray strangely stopped instead of running out the force play. Foli attempted a tag which Murray eluded, and then threw to Phil Garner at second to force DeCinces.  Murray's hesitation allowed Garner to throw to third and catch him in a rundown. Murray slowed up returning to second when he should have sped back since he was entitled to the base with DeCinces being forced out.

Murray would not collect another hit or RBI for the rest of the Series.

In the ninth, after a two-out single by Ott and a walk to Garner, Manny Sanguillén pinch-hit for Don Robinson and hacked a high and outside fastball from Don Stanhouse into right for a single.  Ott barely slid past the outstretched arms of catcher Rick Dempsey to score the winning run, after Murray had questionably cut-off a strong throw from RF Ken Singleton.  Kent Tekulve retired the side in the ninth for the save.

Game 3

The Pirates jumped out to an early 3–0 lead on a Dave Parker sacrifice fly in the first and a one-out, two-run double by Garner in the second. A Benny Ayala one-out, two-run homer cut the Orioles' deficit to one just before a 67-minute rain delay in the middle of the third inning. The Orioles seized the momentum after play resumed by scoring five runs in the fourth, highlighted by a Kiko Garcia bases-loaded triple that chased Pirates starter John Candelaria from the game along with an RBI single by Ken Singleton and groundout by Doug DeCinces off of Enrique Romo. Garcia added a two-out RBI single in the seventh, finishing the evening going 4-for-4 with four RBI. Scott McGregor allowed only one other run after the second (on Bill Madlock's RBI single in the sixth after a Willie Stargell double) and pitched a complete game to give the Orioles a 2–1 series lead.

Game 4

The Pirates seized an early 4–0 lead in the second on a leadoff homer by Stargell, a two-run double by Ott and an Omar Moreno two-out RBI single. The first two were among five straight hits that effectively ended starter Dennis Martínez's afternoon. The Orioles countered with three runs in the third off Jim Bibby on consecutive one-out doubles by Garcia (2 RBI) and Ken Singleton. The Pirates stretched their lead to 6–3 on RBI doubles by John Milner and Parker in the fifth and sixth innings respectively.

With one out in the eighth and the bases loaded, Pirates manager Chuck Tanner sent in submarining relief ace Kent Tekulve to face right-handed hitting Gary Roenicke.  Weaver countered by pinch-hitting lefty John Lowenstein. Lowenstein made the move pay off by slamming a two-run double.  After a walk loaded the bases again, Weaver sent another lefty hitter, Terry Crowley, to bat for Dave Skaggs.  Crowley smashed another two-run double off Tekulve to give the Orioles the lead.  Pitcher Tim Stoddard, batting because Weaver was out of pinch hitters at that point, followed with an RBI single.  An RBI force-out by Bumbry ended the scoring.

Game 5

With a world championship on the line and Game 1 starter Bruce Kison injured, Chuck Tanner decided to go with little-used veteran left-hander Jim Rooker as his starter.  He would let Rooker go as long as possible, then bring in Bert Blyleven to finish, saving his two best pitchers, sore-shouldered John Candelaria and Jim Bibby for Games 6 and 7, if played.  The risky move more than paid off as Rooker gave Tanner five good innings, retiring the first 10 batters, no-hitting for four innings, and holding the Orioles to one run in the fifth when Gary Roenicke scored on a double play grounder.  The Pirate bats finally came alive against Mike Flanagan in the sixth on a sacrifice fly by Willie Stargell and an RBI single by Bill Madlock.  The Pirates added two more in the seventh on a RBI triple by Tim Foli and a RBI double by Dave Parker, and then three more in the eighth on a RBI single by Phil Garner and a two-run single by Foli.  Thanks to the unexpected performance from Rooker, a 4–for–4 day from Madlock, and Foli's three RBIs, the Pirates had staved off defeat.

Chuck Tanner's mother died the morning of Game 5 (this was mentioned during the telecast by announcer Howard Cosell). According to Kent Tukulve, Tanner told the team before the game that his mother was a big Pirates fan, "and she knew we needed some help, so she went to get us some." The 1960 World Series hero Bill Mazeroski threw out the first ball in Game 5, which would be Three Rivers Stadium's final World Series game and, to date, the last World Series game played in Pittsburgh.

Game 6

Back home at Memorial Stadium, local baseball coach Mary Dobkin threw out the ceremonial first pitch. The Oriole bats continued to be unexpectedly cold as John Candelaria and Jim Palmer locked into a scoreless duel through six innings.  Dave Parker broke the ice with a RBI single in the seventh, followed by a Stargell sacrifice fly.  The Pirates added two more runs in the eighth on a Bill Robinson sac fly and a RBI single by Omar Moreno. Kent Tekulve earned his second save of the series.

After the game Howard Cosell in his limo was surrounded and attacked by angry Oriole fans with shaving cream, which prompted Baltimore police to complement his private security for Game 7.

Game 7

The Pirates capped an amazing comeback on the strength of Willie Stargell, who went 4–for–5 with a single, two doubles, and a towering two-run homer in the sixth off Scott McGregor. McGregor pitched eight solid innings in a losing cause.  For insurance in the ninth, Omar Moreno collected an RBI single, while another run scored when Dave Parker and Bill Robinson were hit by pitches back-to-back, scoring Moreno.  Orioles manager Earl Weaver made five pitching changes in the ninth inning in an attempt to keep the game within reach.  The O's only run came on a Rich Dauer homer in the third, the team's only RBI in the last three games (the run in Game 5 scored on a double play, which is not credited as an RBI to the batter).  Significantly, Eddie Murray, the Orioles' main offensive threat, was 0-for-21 in the final five games of the Series, including a fly-out to Parker to end the eighth with the bases loaded (following an intentional walk to Ken Singleton). Following their six run outburst in the eighth inning of Game 4, the Birds scored only two runs on 17 hits over the series final 28 innings. Pirates reliever Grant Jackson got the win after 2 innings after relieving Don Robinson, who had relieved Jim Bibby who lasted four innings and allowed the lone Oriole run.

U.S. President Jimmy Carter made an appearance in Game 7—he threw out the first pitch—and after the game made a visit to the victorious Pittsburgh clubhouse.  Prior to the ceremonial first pitch, Bill Schustik played the National Anthem. Pirates closer Kent Tekulve earned a save.

With the exception of winning the 2013 National League Wild Card Game this is the last postseason series the Pirates have won.

Composite box
1979 World Series (4–3): Pittsburgh Pirates (N.L.) over Baltimore Orioles (A.L.)

Records
Five Pirates had ten or more hits in this series, a World Series record.  Willie Stargell and Phil Garner had 12 hits each, Omar Moreno 11, and Tim Foli and Dave Parker 10 each.  Bill Madlock came close to a sixth with nine hits. The Baltimore Orioles set a record by manager Earl Weaver for most pitchers used in a single inning (five).

Uniforms
The Pirates wore four different uniform combinations during the series:
 gold cap, black jersey and gold pants for Games 1 and 5
 black cap, gold jersey and black pants for Games 2, 6 and 7
 black cap and solid white pinstriped uniform for Game 3
 black cap and solid gold uniform for Game 4.

The Orioles wore three different uniform combinations of their own:
 white cap, orange jersey and white pants for Games 1 and 7
 white cap, white jersey and white pants for Games 2 and 6
 white cap, grey jersey and grey pants for Games 3, 4 and 5

Broadcasting
This was the first World Series in which the participating teams' announcers were not involved in the play-calling on national radio. (Network television had ended the practice two years earlier.) For the '79 Classic, Vin Scully and Sparky Anderson handled the broadcasts for the CBS Radio network.

The Series was televised by ABC Sports, with play-by-play announcers Keith Jackson (in Baltimore) and Al Michaels (in Pittsburgh), and color commentators Howard Cosell and Don Drysdale. ABC's broadcast was also simulcast over the Orioles' and Pirates' respective local television outlets, CBS affiliates WMAR-TV in Baltimore and KDKA-TV in Pittsburgh, in addition to ABC's own affiliates WJZ-TV and WTAE-TV.

In 2006 a "collector's edition" DVD box set, featuring the complete ABC telecasts of all seven games, was issued by Major League Baseball and A&E Home Video.

Notes

See also
1979 Japan Series

References

External links

 Fimrite, Ron. "A Series Of Ups And Downs," Sports Illustrated, October 22, 1979.
 Fimrite, Ron. "Rising From The Ashes," Sports Illustrated, October 29, 1979.
 1979 Pittsburgh Pirates at baseballlibrary.com
 1979 Baltimore Orioles at baseballlibrary.com

World Series
World Series
Pittsburgh Pirates postseason
Baltimore Orioles postseason
World Series
World Series
1970s in Baltimore
1970s in Pittsburgh
October 1979 sports events in the United States
Baseball competitions in Pittsburgh
Baseball competitions in Baltimore